Guanylate cyclase soluble subunit alpha-3 is an enzyme that in humans is encoded by the GUCY1A3 gene.

Function 

Soluble guanylate cyclase (sGC), a heterodimeric protein consisting of an alpha and a beta subunit, catalyzes the conversion of GTP to the second messenger cGMP and functions as the main receptor for nitric oxide and nitrovasodilator drugs. Mutations in this gene have been associated to cases of myocardial infarction (10.1038/nature12722).

References

Further reading

EC 4.6.1